The Macintosh Barents Cyrillic encoding is used in Apple Macintosh computers to represent texts in Kildin Sami, Komi, and Nenets.

Layout 
Each character is shown with its equivalent Unicode code point. Only the second half of the table (code points 128–255) is shown, the first half (code points 0–127) being the same as ASCII.

See also
 ISO-IR-200: ISO 8859-5 derivative created for the same languages, also with Michael Everson's involvement.

References

Character sets
Barents Cyrillic